Poligné is a commune in the Ille-et-Vilaine department of Brittany in northwestern France.

Geography
The river Semnon forms all of the commune's southwestern border.

Population
Inhabitants of Poligné are called polinéens in French.

See also
Communes of the Ille-et-Vilaine department

References

External links

Mayors of Ille-et-Vilaine Association 

Communes of Ille-et-Vilaine